Gornji Lukavac is a village in the municipality of Nevesinje, Republika Srpska, Bosnia and Herzegovina.

History
The capture of the gendarmerie post in Gornji Lukavac was one of the first actions of the June 1941 uprising in eastern Herzegovina.

References

Populated places in Nevesinje
Villages in Republika Srpska